Samuel Leon Braunstein (born 1961) is a professor at the University of York, UK. He is a member of a research group in non-standard computation, and has a particular interest in quantum information, quantum computation and black hole thermodynamics.

Braunstein has written or edited three books and has published more than one hundred and forty papers, which have been cited over thirty-two thousand times. His most important work was on quantum teleportation, and published in a paper titled Unconditional Quantum Teleportation. The paper has been cited more than three thousand times and has received significant coverage in both the scientific and mainstream press.

In February 2006, Braunstein made the news due to his involvement in the first successful demonstration of Quantum telecloning.

From 2009, he began to research on black hole thermodynamics, he especially contributed to the Black hole information paradox and the Firewall paradox.

Braunstein co-authored papers with Gilles Brassard and Simone Severini, with whom he introduced the Braunstein-Ghosh-Severini Entropy of a graph.<ref>

Education
He completed his PhD in 1988 at Caltech, under Carlton M. Caves with a thesis entitled: Novel Quantum States and Measurements.

Academic career 
 University of Melbourne - BSc and MSc in Physics
 California Institute of Technology - PhD in Physics, awarded in 1988
 University of Arizona, USA - Research Associate (1988 - 1991)
 Technion, Israel - Lady Davis Fellow (1991 - 1993)
 Weizmann Institute of Science, Israel - Feinberg Fellow (1993 - 1995)
 University of Ulm, Germany - Humboldt Fellow (1995 - 1996)
 School of Informatics, University of Wales, Bangor, UK - Lecturer through Professor (1996 - 2003)
 Department of Computer Science, University of York, UK - Professor (2003-)

Awards and honors
2001 — Fellow of the Institute of Physics
2003 — Royal Society Wolfson Research Merit Award
2008 — Fellow of The Optical Society
2011 — Fellow of the American Association for the Advancement of Science

Books 
 Samuel L. Braunstein: Quantum Computing: Where Do We Want To Go Tomorrow?, Wiley-VCH, 
 Samuel L. Braunstein and Hoi-Kwong Lo: Scalable Quantum Computers: Paving the Way to Realization, Wiley-VCH, 
 Samuel L. Braunstein and Arun K. Pati (Eds.): Quantum Information with Continuous Variables, Springer,

See also
 Quantum Aspects of Life
 Arun K. Pati
 Continuous-variable quantum information

Notes

External links 
 Sam Braunstein's homepage
 Abstract and PDF of Unconditional Quantum Teleportation
 Braunstein's math genealogy

Living people
1961 births
Royal Society Wolfson Research Merit Award holders
Australian physicists
Australian Jews
Quantum physicists
Academics of the University of York
Quantum information scientists